, known in Europe as Shingeki no Kyojin: Humanity in Chains, is an action game developed and published by Spike Chunsoft for the Nintendo 3DS, based on Hajime Isayama's Attack on Titan manga series. The game was originally released in Japan on December 5, 2013, with an updated version, Attack on Titan: Jinrei Saigo no Tsubasa CHAIN, released on December 4, 2014. This version of the game was localized by Atlus and released on the Nintendo eShop in North America on May 12, 2015, and in Europe on July 2, 2015.

Gameplay
The game casts players in role of characters from the Attack on Titan series, or a character they created, as they take hold of three-dimensional maneuver gear to attack Titans, giants that hunt and devour humans. The game's most recent iteration features a single player story mode, local and online multiplayer, and Circle Pad Pro support.

Reception

The game received predominantly negative reviews. It was given a 4.9 by IGN. It has a score of 46/100 on Metacritic. GameSpot awarded it a score of 4.0 out of 10, saying "Between the can't-look-away morbidity of being eaten and watching the ensemble cast persevere, there's no denying the draw of Attack on Titan and the potential for a superb game adaptation. Humanity in Chains just isn't that game." Nintendo World Report awarded it 3 out of ten, saying "What I got is something that you should have no business playing, and I look forward to reclaiming over 12,000 blocks of 3DS memory very soon." USgamer awarded it 1.5 out of 5, saying "If you enjoy the series, your time would be better spent just watching it all over again." Destructoid was more positive, awarding it 7 out of 10, and stated the game "often can't shake the limitations of the 3DS platform, but it captures most of what makes the anime's world so captivating."

See also
 Attack on Titan (video game)
 Attack on Titan 2

References

External links
 Official website at Spike Chunsoft 
 Official website at Atlus 

Humanity In Chains
2013 video games
2014 video games
Nintendo 3DS games
Nintendo 3DS-only games
Nintendo 3DS eShop games
Video games based on anime and manga
Video games developed in Japan
Action video games
Single-player video games
Examu games